Saih Al-Dahal (Community: 971) is a small bedouin community located 50 km south of Dubai, United Arab Emirates. It is the location where Mohammed bin Rashid Al Maktoum Solar Park has been commissioned in 2013 by Dubai Electricity and Water Authority.

The location (of the community) has a very less population density and further testing showed the lowest accumulation of dust and smaller particle surface area which directly reduces the spectral soiling losses in case of solar power plants.

Gallery

See also
 Mohammed bin Rashid Al Maktoum Solar Park

References

Populated places in Dubai
Bedouins in Asia